Feb. 2 - Eastern Orthodox liturgical calendar - Feb. 4

All fixed commemorations below are observed on February 16 by Eastern Orthodox Churches on the Old Calendar.

For February 3rd, Orthodox Churches on the Old Calendar commemorate the Saints listed on January 21.

Feasts

 Afterfeast of the Meeting of Our Lord.

Saints

 Prophet Azariah (10th century B.C.)
 Holy and Righteous Symeon the God-receiver and Anna the Prophetess (1st century)
 Martyrs Papias, Diodorus, and Claudianus, at Perge in Pamphylia (250)  (see also: October 25)
 Martyr Blaise of Caesarea in Cappadocia (3rd century)
 Martyrs Paul and Simon, by the sword. 
 Martyr Paul the Syrian (284-305)
 Martyrs Adrian and Eubulus, at Caesarea in Cappadocia (c. 308-309)
 Venerable Claudius.
 Saint Laurence of Canterbury, the second Archbishop of Canterbury (619)  (see also: February 2  - West)

Pre-Schism Western saints
 Saint Celerinus the Martyr (c.250)
 Martyrs Laurentinus, Ignatius and Celerina, martyrs in North Africa (3rd century)
 Martyrs Felix, Symphronius (Sempronius), Hippolytus and Companions, a group of martyrs in North Africa.
 Saints Tigides (4th century) and Remedius (419), two bishops who succeeded one another as Bishops of Gap in France.
 Virgin-martyr Ia of Cornwall (Hia, Ives), a Cornish evangelist and martyr (450)
 Saints Lupicinus and Felix, Bishops of Lyons in France (5th century)
 Saint Laurence the Illuminator (Lawrence of Spoleto), Bishop of Spoleto, then founder of Farfa Abbey (576)
 Saint Philip of Vienne, Bishop of Vienne in France (c. 578)
 Saint Caellainn (Caoilfionn), a church in Roscommon in Ireland is dedicated to her (6th century?)
 Saint Hadelin of Dinant, founder of the monastery of Chelles, in Belgium (690)
 Saint Werburga of Chester, Abbess (c. 700)
 Saint Berlinda of Meerbeke (Berlindis, Bellaude), a niece of St Amandus, she became a nun at Moorsel near Alost in Belgium, and later an anchoress in Meerbeke (702)
 Saint Werburgh of Bardney, a widow who became a nun, probably at Bardney Abbey in England, where she later became Abbess (c. 785)
 Saint Deodatus, a monk at Lagny Abbey in France (8th century)
 Saint Ansgar of Hamburg, Bishop of Hamburg, Enlightener of Denmark and Sweden, "Apostle of the North" (865)
 Saint Anatolius, a bishop in Scotland, who went to Rome on pilgrimage and settled as a hermit in Salins in the Jura in France (9th century)
 Saint Liafdag, Bishop in Jutland in Denmark, martyred by pagans (c. 980)
 Saint Oliver of Ancona (Oliverius, Liberius), a monk at Santa Maria di Portonuovo in Ancona in Italy (c. 1050)

Post-Schism Orthodox saints

 Saint Svyatoslav-Gabriel and his son Saint Dimitry, of Yuriev (1253)
 Saint Romanus of Uglich, Prince of Uglich (1285)
 Saint Symeon of Tver, Bishop of Polotsk and Tver, first bishop there (1289)
 Saint James (Jakov I), Archbishop of Serbia (1292)
 Venerable Sabbas of Ioannina (15th century)
 Saint Ignatius of Mariupol in the Crimea, Metropolitan of Gothia and Kafa (1786)
 New Martyrs Stamatius and John, brothers, and their companion Nicholas, of Spetses, at Chios (1822)
 Saint Nicholas of Japan, Equal-to-the-Apostles, Enlightener of Japan (1912)

New martyrs and confessors

 New Hieromartyr Vladimir (Zagreba), Hieromonk of Borisoglebsk Monastery, Novotorzhok (1938)
 New Hieromartyr Basil Zalessky, Archpriest, of Astrakhan (1938)
 New Hieromartyr Adrian Troitsky, Archpriest, of Kazan (1938)
 New Hieromartyrs John Tomilov, Timothy Izotov, Priests (1938)
 Martyr Michael Agayev (1938)

Other commemorations

 Repose of Schemamonk Paul of Simonov Monastery (1825), disciple of St. Paisius (Velichkovsky).
 Repose of Hieromonk Isidore of Gethsemane Skete in Moscow (1908)

Icon gallery

Notes

References

Sources
 February 3 / 16. Orthodox Calendar (Pravoslavie.ru).
 February 16 / 3. Holy Trinity Russian Orthodox Church (A parish of the Patriarchate of Moscow).
 February 3. OCA - The Lives of the Saints.
 The Autonomous Orthodox Metropolia of Western Europe and the Americas. St. Hilarion Calendar of Saints for the year of our Lord 2004. St. Hilarion Press (Austin, TX). p. 12.
 The Third Day of the Month of February. Orthodoxy in China.
 February 3. Latin Saints of the Orthodox Patriarchate of Rome.
 The Roman Martyrology. Transl. by the Archbishop of Baltimore. Last Edition, According to the Copy Printed at Rome in 1914. Revised Edition, with the Imprimatur of His Eminence Cardinal Gibbons. Baltimore: John Murphy Company, 1916. pp. 36–37.
 Rev. Richard Stanton. A Menology of England and Wales, or, Brief Memorials of the Ancient British and English Saints Arranged According to the Calendar, Together with the Martyrs of the 16th and 17th Centuries. London: Burns & Oates, 1892. pp. 48-50.
Greek Sources
 Great Synaxaristes:  3 Φεβρουαρίου. Μεγασ Συναξαριστησ.
  Συναξαριστής. 3 Φεβρουαρίου. Ecclesia.gr. (H Εκκλησια Τησ Ελλαδοσ).
Russian Sources
  16 февраля (3 февраля). Православная Энциклопедия под редакцией Патриарха Московского и всея Руси Кирилла (электронная версия). (Orthodox Encyclopedia - Pravenc.ru).
  3 февраля по старому стилю / 16 февраля по новому стилю. Русская Православная Церковь - Православный церковный календарь на 2018 год.

February in the Eastern Orthodox calendar